Ischiosioma is a genus of longhorn beetles of the subfamily Lamiinae, containing the following species:

 Ischiosioma albata Martins & Galileo, 1990
 Ischiosioma obliquata Martins & Galileo, 1990

References

Onciderini